Salv'a lo vescovo senato, also known as the Cantilena giullaresca, because it was written for performance by a jongleur, or Ritmo laurenziano, because it was found in a codex (Santa Croce XV, IV) of the Biblioteca Mediceo Laurenziana in Florence, is a lyric poem in the Tuscan language. It was probably composed in the third quarter of the twelfth century (1150–71) by a Tuscan poet. It is the earliest surviving piece of poetry in an unmistakably Italian dialect. 

Salv'a lo vescovo senato comprises twenty monorhyming ottonari. In the same manuscript is found a martyrology. Two internal references in the poem constrain its dating: a mention of Galgano Inghirami, Bishop of Volterra from 1150 to 1157, and of Grimaldo, Bishop of Osimo from 1151 to 1157. Bruno Migliorini describes the poem:
Il giullare si rivolge a un vescovo (Villano, arcivescovo di Pisa, secondo l'ipotesi del Cesareo, accolta dal Mazzoni) facendone lodi sperticate e pronosticandogli nientemeno che il pontificato, con la speranza di ottenere in dono un cavallo: se lo ottiene, lo mostrerà al vescovo di Volterra, Galgano.
The jongleur addresses a bishop (Villano, Archbishop of Pisa, according to the hypothesis of Cesareo, following Mazzoni) making drawn-out praises and go so far as to predict for him a pontificate, in the hopes of obtaining a horse: if he obtains it, he will show it to the bishop of Volterra, Galgano.

External links
Giuseppe Bonghi, Introduzione ai Ritmi delle Origini della Letteratura italiana (Duecento)
Text at Bibliotheca Augustana

Notes

Italian poems
Medieval poetry